Airport Market station is a subway station on Line 9 of the Seoul Metropolitan Subway. The station is located in the Gonghang neighborhood of Gangseo District, Seoul.

Station layout

Railway stations opened in 2009
2009 establishments in South Korea
Seoul Metropolitan Subway stations
Metro stations in Gangseo District, Seoul